Daniel Tolar (born 11 April 1982) is an Australian former professional rugby league footballer who played 101 games for the Newcastle Knights, primarily as a .

Background
Tolar was born in Newcastle, New South Wales.

Playing career
Tolar made his first grade debut in round 12 of the 2004 NRL season against Melbourne.  

In 2005, Tolar made 20 appearances as Newcastle suffered a horrid season on the field finishing last with the wooden spoon. 

In 2010, in reward for his long service at the club, he was awarded the captaincy of the Newcastle Knights in the Round 14 game against the New Zealand Warriors due to the absence of regular captain Kurt Gidley and vice-captain Steve Simpson.

On 26 September 2011, Tolar announced his retirement from the game after ongoing knee and Achilles tendon injuries.

References

External links
2011 Newcastle Knights profile

1982 births
Living people
Australian rugby league players
Central Charlestown Butcher Boys players
Central Coast Centurions players
Newcastle Knights captains
Newcastle Knights players
Rugby league players from Newcastle, New South Wales
Rugby league props